The 2018 Bulacan Kuyas season is the 1st season of the franchise in the Maharlika Pilipinas Basketball League (MPBL).

Key dates
 January 25, 2018: Inaugural season of the Maharlika Pilipinas Basketball League (MPBL) starts.

Current roster

Head coaches

Anta Rajah Cup

Eliminations

Standings

Game log

|- style="background:#bfb;"
| 1
| January 30
| Imus
| W 93–79
| John Gonzales (26)
| JR Taganas (11)
| Stephen Siruma (6)
| Bulacan Capitol Gymnasium
| 1–0

|- style="background:#fcc;"
| 2
| February 3
| Navotas
| L 76–77
| Jovit Dela Cruz (15)
| Taganas, Gonzales (8)
| Siruma, Taganas (5)
| Batangas City Coliseum
| 1–1
|- style="background:#fcc;"
| 3
| February 8
| Parañaque
| L 72–74
| Marlon Monte (13)
| John Gonzales (8)
| Stephen Siruma (6)
| Valenzuela Astrodome
| 1–2
|- style="background:#fcc;"
| 4
| February 13
| Muntinlupa
| L 71–75
| Martinez, Napoles (12)
| Jorey Napoles (14)
| Stephen Siruma (6)
| Bataan People's Center
| 1–3
|- style="background:#bfb;"
| 5
| February 17
| Caloocan
| W 92–74
| Stephen Siruma (15)
| JR Taganas (17)
| James Martinez (6)
| Navotas Sports Complex
| 2–3
|- style="background:#bfb;"
| 6
| February 24
| Quezon City
| W 95–81
| Jovit Dela Cruz (18)
| JR Taganas (13)
| Stephen Siruma (8)
| Bulacan Capitol Gymnasium
| 3–3

|- style="background:#bfb;"
| 7
| March 3
| Batangas City
| W 80–72
| Jovit Dela Cruz (14)
| JR Taganas (10)
| Stephen Siruma (4)
| Imus City Sports Complex
| 4–3
|- style="background:#bfb;"
| 8
| March 10
| Valenzuela
| W 92–83
| JR Taganas (19)
| Jorey Napoles (11)
| Siruma, Napoles (5)
| Olivares College Gymnasium
| 5–3
|- style="background:#bfb;"
| 9
| March 17
| Bataan
| W 81–74
| Siruma, Martinez (15)
| Stephen Siruma (10)
| John Gonzales (6)
| Bulacan Capitol Gymnasium
| 6–3

Playoffs

Brackets

Game log

|- style="background:#bfb;"
| 1
| March 22
| Parañaque
| W 83–73
| Stephen Siruma (24)
| JR Taganas (16)
| Stephen Siruma (8)
| Bulacan Capitol Gymnasium
| 1–0
|- style="background:#fcc;"
| 2
| March 27
| Parañaque
| L 54–81
| Siruma, Napoles (12)
| Taganas, Siruma, Napoles (7)
| JR Taganas (3)
| Muntinlupa Sports Complex
| 1–1
|- style="background:#fcc;"
| 3
| April 3
| Parañaque
| L 70–77
| Hernal Escosio (13)
| Jorey Napoles (11)
| Gonzales, Monte (3)
| Bulacan Capitol Gymnasium
| 1–2

Anta Datu Cup

Elimination

Standings

Game log

|- style="background:#bfb;"
| 1
| June 19
| Rizal
| W 80–61
| James Martinez (18)
| JR Taganas (16)
| JR Taganas (7)
| Baliwag Star Arena
| 1–0
|- style="background:#fcc;"
| 2
| June 30
| San Juan
| L 76–94
| Jason Melano (21)
| JR Taganas (11)
| Stephen Siruma (7)
| Valenzuela Astrodome
| 1–1

|- style="background:#bfb;"
|3
|July 12
|@ Bacoor City
|W 77–76
|JR Taganas (14)
|JR Taganas (11)
|Siruma, Melano (4)
|Strike Gymnasium
|2–1
|- style="background:#bfb;"
|4
|July 25
|Parañaque
|W 77–58
|JR Taganas (14)
|Taganas, Melano (10)
|Stephen Siruma (9)
|Bulacan Capitol Gymnasium
|3–1

|- style="background:#bfb;"
|5
|August 1
|Davao Occidental
|W 88–85
|Stephen Siruma (17)
|JR Taganas (10)
|Jerrick Cañada (10)
|Filoil Flying V Centre
|4–1
|- style="background:#bfb;"
|6
|August 7
|Basilan
|W 59–57
|Jerick Cañada (17)
|JR Taganas (8)
|Jerrick Cañada (4)
|Marist School Gymnasium
|5–1
|- style="background:#fcc;"
|7
|August 16
|@ Manila
|L 62–84
|Hernal Escosio (12)
|Babilonia, Escosio (5 each)
|JR Taganas (8)
|San Andres Sports Complex
|5–2
|- style="background:#bfb;"
|8
|August 28
|Batangas City
|W 63–54
|Hans Thiele (11)
|JR Taganas (17)
|Jerrick Cañada (13)
|Bulacan Capitol Gymnasium
|6–2

|- style="background:#fcc;"
|9
|September 18
|General Santos
|L 43–56
|Jorey Napoles (15)
|JR Taganas (10)
|Jerrick Cañada (8)
|JRU Gymnasium
|6–3
|- style="background:#bfb;"
|10
|September 27
|Imus
|W 117–113 (OT)
|Jason Melano (22)
|JR Taganas (26)
|Jerrick Cañada (12)
|Bulacan Capitol Gymnasium
|7–3

|- style="background:#bfb;"
|11
|October 9
|@ Quezon City
|W 61–55
|Jovit Dela Cruz (12)
|JR Taganas (21)
|Jerrick Cañada (5)
|Trinity University of Asia Gymnasium
|8–3
|- style="background:#fcc;"
|12
|October 23
|@ Bataan
|L 49–63
|Hans Thiele (10)
|Hans Thiele (13)
|Jerrick Cañada (5)
|Bataan People's Center
|8–4
|- style ="background:#fcc;"
|13
|October 30
|Makati
|L 94–99
|Jerrick Cañada (22)
|JR Taganas (7)
|Jerrick Cañada (9)
|Batangas City Coliseum
|8–5

|- style="background:#bfb;"
|14
|November 12
|@ Pampanga
|W 67–65
|Jorey Napoles (14)
|JR Taganas (8)
|Three players (3)
|Angeles University Foundation Gymnasium
|9–5
|- style="background:#bfb;"
|15
|November 22
|Pasay
|W 73–70
|Stephen Siruma (17)
|Jorey Napoles (12)
|James Martinez (7)
|Bulacan Capitol Gymnasium
|10–5

|- style ="background:#fcc;"
|16
|December 3
|@ Mandaluyong
|L 91–102
|Jason Melano (15)
|JR Taganas (12)
|Jerrick Cañada (11)
|JRU Gymnasium
|10–6
|- style ="background:#bfb;"
|17
|December 12
|Laguna
|W 87–70
|JR Taganas (16)
|JR Taganas (14)
|JR Taganas (5)
|Caloocan Sports Complex
|11–6
|- style ="background:#fcc;"
|18
|December 22
|Zamboanga
|L 72–75
|Jovit Dela Cruz (15)
|JR Taganas (24)
|JR Taganas (6)
|Bulacan Capitol Gymnasium
|11–7

|- style ="background:#fcc;"
|19
|January 5
|Navotas
|L 89–98
|Martinez, Melano (18)
|JR Taganas (8)
|Jerrick Cañada (7)
|Bulacan Capitol Gymnasium
|11–8
|- style ="background:#bfb;"
|20
|January 15
|Pasig
|W 102–96
|James Martinez (21)
|Jan Colina (10)
|Jerrick Cañada (13)
|Batangas State University Gymnasium
|12–8
|- style ="background:#bfb;"
|21
|January 24
|Caloocan
|W 86–82
|Jason Melano (15)
|JR Taganas (12)
|Jerrick Cañada (7)
|Strike Gymnasium
|13–8

|- style="background:#fcc;"
|22
|February 2
|Cebu City
|L 54–70
|Jovit Dela Cruz (13)
|JR Taganas (11)
|Dela Cruz, Melano (4)
|Angeles University Foundation Gymnasium
|13–9
|- style= "background:#fcc;"
|23
|February 12
|@ Valenzuela
|L 75–84
|Jovit Dela Cruz (27)
|JR Taganas (17)
|Jerrick Cañada (8)
|Valenzuela Astrodome
|13–10
|- style= "background:#fcc;"
|24
|February 21
|Muntinlupa
|L 66–86
|Jovit Dela Cruz (13)
|JR Taganas (12)
|Jerrick Cañada (8)
|Muntinlupa Sports Center
|13–11
|- style = "background:#bfb;"
|25
|February 27
|Marikina
|W 79–72
|Jason Melano (17)
|JR Taganas (20)
|JR Taganas (9)
|Bulacan Capitol Gymnasium
|14–11

Playoffs

Game log 

|- style="background:#fcc"
|1
|March 12
|Manila
|L 65–69
|Gywne Capacio (23)
|JR Taganas (16)
|Stephen Siruma (9)
|Bataan People's Center
|0–1
|- style="background:#fcc"
|2
|March 20
|Manila
|L 83–92
|Dela Cruz, Melano (17)
|JR Taganas (10)
|Stephen Siruma (9)
|San Andres Sports Complex
|0–2

External links
 Bulacan Kuyas MPBL page

References

Maharlika Pilipinas Basketball League
2018 MPBL season